International Journal of Philosophical Studies is a peer-reviewed academic journal of philosophy publishing original work from both analytic and continental traditions.

See also 
 List of philosophy journals

External links 
 

Philosophy journals
English-language journals
Taylor & Francis academic journals
Publications established in 1993
5 times per year journals